The 1963–64 Washington State Cougars men's basketball team represented Washington State University for the 1963–64 NCAA college basketball season. Led by sixth-year head coach Marv Harshman, the Cougars were members of the Athletic Association of Western Universities (AAWU,  and played their home games on campus at Bohler Gymnasium in Pullman, Washington.

References

External links
Sports Reference – Washington State Cougars: 1963–64 basketball season

Washington State Cougars men's basketball seasons
Washington State Cougars
Washington State
Washington State